The 2013 Formula 3 Brazil Open was the fourth Formula 3 Brazil Open race held at Autódromo José Carlos Pace from January 17–20, 2013.

After start in the last position on final race, Felipe Guimarães won the event.

Drivers and teams
 All cars are powered by Berta engines, and will run on Pirelli tyres.

Classification

Qualifying

Race 1

Race 2

Pre-final Grid

Pre-final Race

Final Race

See also
Formula Three Sudamericana
Formula Three

References

External links
Official website of the Formula 3 Brazil Open

Formula 3 Brazil Open
Formula 3 Brazil Open
Brazil Open
Brazil F3